The President, Directors and Company of the Bank of the United States, commonly known as the First Bank of the United States, was a national bank, chartered for a term of twenty years, by the United States Congress on February 25, 1791. It followed the Bank of North America, the nation's first de facto national bank. However, neither served the functions of a modern central bank: They did not set monetary policy, regulate private banks, hold their excess reserves, or act as a lender of last resort. They were national insofar as they were allowed to have branches in multiple states and lend money to the US government. Other banks in the US were each chartered by, and only allowed to have branches in, a single state.

Establishment of the Bank of the United States was part of a three-part expansion of federal fiscal and monetary power, along with a federal mint and excise taxes, championed by Alexander Hamilton, first Secretary of the Treasury. Hamilton believed a national bank was necessary to stabilize and improve the nation's credit, and to improve handling of the financial business of the United States government under the newly enacted Constitution.

The First Bank building, located in Philadelphia, Pennsylvania, within Independence National Historical Park, was completed in 1797, and is a National Historic Landmark for its historic and architectural significance.

Background

In 1791, the Bank of the United States was one of the three major financial innovations proposed and supported by Alexander Hamilton, first Secretary of the Treasury. In addition to the national bank, the other measures were an assumption of the state war debts by the U.S. government, establishment of a mint and imposition of a federal excise tax. The goals of Hamilton's three measures were to:
 Establish financial order, clarity, and precedence in and of the newly formed United States.
 Establish credit—both in a country and overseas—for the new nation.
Resolve the issue of the fiat currency, issued by the Continental Congress immediately prior to and during the American Revolutionary War—the "Continental".

In simpler words, Hamilton's four goals were to:
 Have the Federal Government assume the Revolutionary War debts of the several states
 Pay off the war debts
 Raise money for the new government
 Establish a national bank and create a common currency

Proposal
According to the plan put before the first session of the First Congress in 1790, Hamilton proposed establishing the initial funding for the First Bank of the United States through the sale of $10 million in stock of which the United States government would purchase the first $2 million in shares. Hamilton, foreseeing the objection that this could not be done since the U.S. government did not have $2 million, proposed that the government purchase the stock using money lent to it by the bank; the loan to be paid back in ten equal annual installments. The remaining $8 million of stock would be available to the public, both in the United States and overseas. The chief requirement of these non-government purchases was that one-quarter of the purchase price had to be paid in gold or silver; the remaining balance could be paid in bonds, acceptable scrip, etc.

Unlike the Bank of England, the primary function of the bank would be to issue credit to the government and private interests, for internal improvements and other economic development, per Hamilton's system of Public Credit. The business would be involved in on behalf of the federal government—a depository for collected taxes, making short-term loans to the government to cover real or potential temporary income gaps, serving as a holding site for both incoming and outgoing monies—was considered highly important but still secondary in nature.

There were other, non-negotiable conditions for the establishment of the First Bank of the United States. Among these were:
 That the bank would have a twenty-year charter running from 1791 to 1811, after which time it would be up to the Congress to approve or deny renewal of the bank and its charter; however, during that time no other federal bank would be authorized; states, for their part, would be free to charter however many intrastate banks they wished.
That the bank, to avoid any appearance of impropriety, would:
be forbidden to buy a government bond.
have a mandatory rotation of directors.
neither issue notes nor incur debts beyond its actual capitalization.
 That foreigners, whether overseas or residing in the United States, would be allowed to be First Bank of the United States stockholders, but would not be allowed to vote.
That the Secretary of the Treasury would be free to remove government deposits, inspect the books, and require statements regarding the bank's condition as frequently as once a week.

To ensure that the government could meet both the current and future demands of its governmental accounts, an additional source of funding was required, "for interest payments on the assumed state debts would begin to fall due at the end of 1791...those payments would require $788,333 annually, and... an additional $38,291 was needed to cover deficiencies in the funds that had been appropriated for existing commitments." To achieve this, Hamilton repeated a suggestion he had made nearly a year before—increase the duty on imported spirits, plus raise the excise tax on domestically distilled whiskey and other liquors. Local opposition to the tax led to the Whiskey Rebellion.

Opposition

Hamilton's bank proposal faced widespread resistance from opponents of increased federal power. Secretary of State Thomas Jefferson and James Madison led the opposition, which claimed that the bank was unconstitutional, and that it benefited merchants and investors at the expense of the majority of the population.

Like most of the Southern members of Congress, Jefferson and Madison also opposed a second of the three proposals of Hamilton: establishing an official government Mint. They believed this centralization of power away from local banks was dangerous to a sound monetary system and was mostly to the benefit of business interests in the commercial north, not southern agricultural interests, arguing that the right to own property would be infringed by these proposals. Furthermore, they contended that the creation of such a bank violated the Constitution, which specifically stated that Congress was to regulate weights and measures and issue coined money (rather than mint and bills of credit).

The first part of the bill, the concept, and establishment of a national mint, met with no real objection, and sailed through; it was assumed the second and third part (the bank and an excise tax to finance it) would likewise glide through, and in their own way they did: The House version of the bill, despite some heated objections, easily passed. The Senate version of the bill did likewise, with considerably fewer, and milder, objections. It was when "the two bills changed houses, complications set in. In the Senate, Hamilton's supporters objected to the House's alteration of the plans for the excise tax."

The establishment of the bank also raised early questions of constitutionality in the new government. Hamilton, then Secretary of the Treasury, argued that the bank was an effective means to utilize the authorized powers of the government implied under the law of the Constitution. Secretary of State Thomas Jefferson argued that the bank violated traditional property laws and that its relevance to constitutionally authorized powers was weak. Another argument came from James Madison, who believed Congress had not received the power to incorporate a bank or any other governmental agency. His argument rested primarily on the Tenth Amendment: that all powers not endowed to Congress are retained by the States (or the people). Additionally, his belief was that if the Constitution's writers had wanted Congress to have such power, they would have made it explicit. The decision would ultimately fall on President George Washington, following his deliberate investigation of the cabinet members' opinions.

Presidential approval
George Washington initially declared that he was hesitant to sign the "bank bill" into law. Washington asked for the written advice and supporting reasons from all his cabinet members—most particularly from Hamilton. Attorney General Edmund Randolph from Virginia felt that the bill was unconstitutional. Jefferson, also from Virginia, agreed that Hamilton's proposal was against both the spirit and letter of the Constitution. Hamilton, who, unlike his fellow cabinet members, came from New York, quickly responded to those who claimed incorporation of the bank unconstitutional. While Hamilton's rebuttals were many and varied, chief among them were these two:

What the government could do for a person (incorporate), it could not refuse to do for an "artificial person", a business. And the First Bank of the United States is privately owned and not a government agency, was a business. "Thus...unquestionably incident to sovereign power to erect corporations to that of the United States, in relation to the objects entrusted to the management of the government."
Any government by its very nature was sovereign "and includes by force of the term a right to attainment of the ends...which are not precluded by restrictions & exceptions specified in the constitution...

On February 25, 1791, convinced that the constitution authorized the measure, Washington signed the "bank bill" into law.

On March 19, 1791 Washington appointed three Commissioners for the taking of subscriptions for this new bank: Thomas Willing, David Rittenhouse, and Samuel Howell.

Willing was later elected as President on October 25, 1791, until he resigned due to ill health on November 10, 1807. He was succeeded by David Lenox, serving until the expiration of its charter on March 4, 1811.

Expiration of charter
After Hamilton left office in 1795, the new Secretary of the Treasury Oliver Wolcott, Jr. informed Congress that, due to the existing state of government finances, more money was needed. This could be achieved either by selling the government's shares of stock in the bank or by raising taxes. Wolcott advised the first choice. Congress quickly agreed. Hamilton objected, believing that the dividends on that stock had been inviolably pledged for the support of the sinking fund to retire the debt. Hamilton tried to organize opposition to the measure but was unsuccessful.

In 1816, the bank was succeeded by the Second Bank of the United States.

Purchase by Girard
After the charter for the First Bank of the United States expired in 1811, Stephen Girard purchased most of its stock as well as the building and its furnishings on South Third Street in Philadelphia and opened his own bank, later known as Girard Bank. Girard hired George Simpson, the cashier of the First Bank of the United States, as cashier of the new bank, and with seven other employees, opened for business on May 18, 1812. He allowed the Trustees of the First Bank of the United States to use some offices and space in the vaults to continue the process of winding down the affairs of the closed bank at a very nominal rent.

Over its early history the bank was known as "Girard's Bank," or as "Girard Bank"  or also as "Stephen Girard's Bank" or even the "Bank of Stephen Girard." Girard was the sole proprietor of his bank, and thus avoided the Pennsylvania state law which prohibited an unincorporated association of persons from establishing a bank, and which required a charter from the legislature for a banking corporation.

Bank building

The First Bank of the United States was established in Philadelphia, Pennsylvania, while the city served as the national capital, from 1790 to 1800. The bank began operations in Carpenters' Hall in 1791, some 200 feet from its permanent home.

Design of the bank building is credited to Samuel Blodgett, Superintendent of Buildings for the new capital in Washington, DC., although it has also been attributed to James Hoban. It was completed in 1795.

The First Bank of the United States has received various designations as a historic building. It was included in Independence National Historical Park when the park was formed in 1956. The building's architecture was studied by the Historic American Buildings Survey in 1958. With the rest of Independence National Historical Park, it was listed on the National Register of Historic Places on October 15, 1966, and the bank was then declared a National Historic Landmark on May 4, 1987.  It is described in the landmark designation as an early masterpiece of monumental Classical Revival design.

Until about 2000, the building housed offices for Independence National Historical Park. A proposal to have it house the collection of the Philadelphia Civil War Museum was abandoned when funding from the state of Pennsylvania was not forthcoming. Future plans for the building are to house the National Park Service archaeology lab which is currently located across the street.

See also

Bank Bill of 1791
Federal Reserve Act
History of central banking in the United States
United States Department of the Treasury
Stephen Simpson (writer), journalist and outspoke critic of the Bank and its practices
List of National Historic Landmarks in Philadelphia
McCulloch v. Maryland, Supreme Court case holding that Maryland could not tax the First Bank of the United States
National Register of Historic Places listings in Center City, Philadelphia

References

Further reading

 Lomazoff, Eric. Reconstructing the National Bank Controversy: Politics and Law in the Early American Republic. (U of Chicago Press, 2018) online review, advanced historical research
 Lomazoff, Eric. "Turning (Into) 'The Great Regulating Wheel': The Conversion of the Bank of the United States, 1791–1811." Studies in American Political Development 26.1 (2012): 1-23.
 

 Morgan, H. Wayne. "The Origins and Establishment of the First Bank of the United States." Business History Review 30.4 (1956): 472-492. online
 Perkins, Edwin J.  American public finance and financial services, 1700–1815 (1994) pp. 324–48. online free
 Reid, Charles J. "America's First Great Constitutional Controversy: Alexander Hamilton's Bank of the United States." U. of St. Thomas Law JournalJ 14 (2018): 105-192.  online
 , libertarian approach
 
 Wright, Robert E. and David J. Cowen. Financial Founding Fathers: The Men Who Made America Rich (2006)  excerpt
 Wright, Robert E. One nation under debt: Hamilton, Jefferson, and the history of what we owe (McGraw Hill Professional, 2008).

External links

Documents produced by the First Bank of the United States on FRASER
Hamilton's opinion
Jefferson's opinion
Record of the Debate

Buildings and structures in Independence National Historical Park
Bank buildings in Philadelphia
Defunct banks of the United States
Former central banks
Commercial buildings completed in 1797
Bank buildings on the National Register of Historic Places in Philadelphia
National Historic Landmarks in Pennsylvania
1st United States Congress
Presidency of George Washington
Economic history of the United States
1791 establishments in the United States
Banks established in 1791
Banks disestablished in 1811
1791 establishments in Pennsylvania
1810s in Pennsylvania
1811 disestablishments in Pennsylvania
Defunct companies based in Pennsylvania
Independence National Historical Park
Historic American Buildings Survey in Philadelphia
Unused buildings in Pennsylvania
18th-century architecture in the United States
Neoclassical architecture in Pennsylvania
American companies established in 1791
Greek Revival architecture in Pennsylvania
American companies disestablished in 1811